Havel's Place is a public art project, which creates a series of memorial places dedicated to the last president of Czechoslovakia and the first president of the Czech Republic, Václav Havel. The installation consists of two garden chairs around a round table, usually with a tree going through its middle. The rim of the table has the Havel Quote 'truth and love shall prevail over lies and hatred' inscribed along its rim.

Origins
The original idea for Havel's Place came from Petr Gandalovič, the Czech Ambassador to the United States. He invited Bořek Šípek, an architect and designer, to create a piece of public art to represent Havel and his democratic views. Šípek had overseen a decade-long renovation of the interior of Prague Castle as President Havel's Head Architect in the 1990s, and made a number of artworks for his close friend. In the 2008 documentary about Havel, Citizen Havel, by Pavel Koutecký and Miroslav Janek, the President stated that he would like people to subconsciously connect his person with Bořek Šípek's design and art.

Šípek came up with a design symbolising "Democratic Debate", comprising two metal garden chairs placed around a table around a linden tree, the national tree of the Czech Republic. His idea was to create a gathering place in a public space to promote dialogue, discussion and freedom of speech. Bořek Šípek named the installation "Democracy Talks" and described it as "a place where people can meet and exercise their freedom of speech in a democratic dialogue with others".

Tomáš Halík, a close friend of Havel, told Czech Radio on 5 October 2013 that "the bench with the two chairs symbolises the willingness to sit down at a table and talk. That is, in my opinion, another important message left by Václav Havel: Even as people of different opinions, different political beliefs and different religions, it is still immensely important to sit down at a table and talk to one another in search for the truth."

Partner cities

The first Havel's Place was installed in the grounds of Georgetown University in Washington D.C on 2 October 2013, with the support of Georgetown University, the Czech Embassy, Václav Havel Library and American Friends of Czech Republic. It was dedicated by former U.S. Secretary of State Madeleine Albright and Dagmar Havlová, Havel's widow.

At a meeting in Prague a few days after the installation of the Havel's Place bench in Georgetown, Sipek met with Art for Amnesty founder Bill Shipsey who proposed that further Havel's Places would be installed in cities around the world. It was decided to start with Dublin Shipsey's home town. The Dublin "Havel's Place" was installed in St. Patrick's Park (adjacent to St. Patrick’s Cathedral) in Dublin, Ireland on Human Rights Day, 2013 (10 December) by the Lord Mayor of Dublin Oisin Quinn and Karel Schwarzenberg Havel's former Chancellor. The Dublin project was conceived and promoted by Bill Shipsey with support from the City of Dublin and the Czech Ambassador to Ireland Tomas Kafka.

The next Havel's Place, "Espai Havel", ("Havel's Place" in Catalan) was dedicated in Barcelona by the Mayor of Barcelona, Xavier Trias, and Karel Schwarzenberg on 15 February 2014 in the Parc de la Ciutadella beside the Catalan Parliament building. This Havel's Place was also conceived and promoted by Bill Shipsey.

On 1 May 2014 the fourth Havel's Place was dedicated in Maltese Square in Havel's home town of Prague.

On 11 June 2014 the fifth Havel's Place was unveiled in the University of South Bohemia in České Budějovice, as part of an international project of public places dedicated to the late Czech president.

On 27 September 2014 the sixth 'Havel's Place' was unveiled on the Campus of Venice International University, San Servolo Island. Venice in the presence of Ambassador Umberto Vattani, President of Venice International University; Petr Burianek, Czech Ambassador to Italy; Honorary Consul of the Czech Republic, Giorgio Boatto; and Professor Agar Brugiavini, the Dean of Venice International University. Michaela Jorgensen-Day and Bill Shipsey raised the money for the project.

On 4 October 2014, the 7th Havel's Place was unveiled in front of the café at the Municipal Library in Hradec Králové, Czech Republic. The creation of a Havel's Place in Hradec Králové was initiated by deputy mayor Josef Krofta.

In November 2014, two Havel's Places were unveiled to honour the 25th anniversary of the Velvet Revolution. The 8th Havel's Place was promoted by then Czech Ambassador to the U.K. Michael Zantovsky and unveiled on November 6 at Oxford University on the banks of the River Cherwell.

The 9th, promoted by Bill Shipsey and Iveta Stanislavova, was dedicated at The Hague, November 8, at Lange Voorhout, by: Jozias van Aarsten, Mayor of The Hague; H.E. Jaroslav Horák, Ambassador of the Czech Republic to the Netherlands; Eduard Nazarski, Netherlands Amnesty International Director; and Bořek Šípek.

On 22 June 2017 a Havel's Place was unveiled in Lisbon in a collaboration between the Czech Ambassador to Portugal, Cultural Counsellor to the Camara de Lisboa Catarina Vaz Pinto and Bill Shipsey. Karel Schwarzenberg attended the dedication.

The 25th Havel's Place was unveiled in Ljubljana on 16 March 2018 by Nataša Posel, Director of Amnesty International Slovenia and Mateja Demšič Head of the Department of Culture of the City of Ljubljana. This was also promoted by Bill Shipsey and was the first Havel's Place in a city of a former communist country outside the Czech Republic.

Václav Havel's Place

References

Czech art
Václav Havel